George Arnett (born c. 1928) was a Canadian football player who played for the Toronto Argonauts, Hamilton Tiger-Cats, and Ottawa Rough Riders. He won the Grey Cup with Hamilton in 1957. He previously played football at and attended McMaster University.

References

1920s births
Year of birth uncertain
Possibly living people
Hamilton Tiger-Cats players
McMaster Marauders football players
Ottawa Rough Riders players
Players of Canadian football from Ontario
Canadian football people from Toronto
Toronto Argonauts players